An election to the Carmarthenshire County Council was held in April 1961. It was preceded by the 1958 election and followed, by the 1964 election.

Overview of the result

A close run election resulted in Labour increasing its majority by two after capturing an additional two seats. In addition, Labour took the majority of the aldermanic vacancies.

Boundary changes

There were no boundary changes at this election.

Retiring aldermen

A number of retiring councilors stood down to allow retiring aldermen to be returned unopposed. These included D.T. Williams at Llangadog, who stood down in favour of Gwynfor Evans.

Unopposed returns

39 members were returned unopposed, including six of the nine members in Llanelli town.

Contested elections

20 contests took place.

Summary of results

59 councillors were elected.

Ward results

Abergwili

Ammanford No.1

Ammanford No.2

Berwick

Burry Port East

Burry Port West

Caio

Carmarthen Division 1

Carmarthen Division 2

Carmarthen Division 3

Cenarth

Cilycwm

Conwil

Cwmamman

Felinfoel

Hengoed

Kidwelly

Laugharne

Llanarthney

Llanboidy

Llandebie North

Llandebie South

Llandilo Rural

Llandilo Urban

Llandovery

Llandyssilio

Llanedy

Llanegwad

Llanelly Division.1

Llanelly Division 2

Llanelly Division 3

Llanelly Division 4

Llanelly Division 5

Llanelly Division 6

Llanelly Division 7

Llanelly Division 8

Llanelly Division 9

Llanfihangel Aberbythych

Llanfihangel-ar-Arth

Llangadog

Llangeler

Llangendeirne

Llangennech

Llangunnor

Llanon
Labour had lost this ward in a by-election.

Llansawel

Llanstephan

Llanybyther

Myddfai

Pembrey

Pontyberem

Quarter Bach

Rhydcymerau

St Clears

St Ishmaels

Trelech

Trimsaran

Westfa

Whitland

Election of aldermen

In addition to the 59 councillors the council consisted of 19 county aldermen. Aldermen were elected by the council, and served a six-year term. Following the elections, the majority of the aldermanic seats were taken by Labour.

References

1961
1961 Welsh local elections